Bangladesh Home Economics College is an constituent college of the University of Dhaka, directed by the governing body of Dhaka University. The Faculty of Biological Science of the University of Dhaka directly monitors all academic activities of the college. It was founded in 1996. It is an all girls' college.

Courses
Level of education is B.Sc. (Hons.), B.Sc(pass), M.S(Preli) & M.S.
Medium of education is Bengali & English
No. of Honours Department	05

Departments
There are five departments:

1. Food and Nutrition
2. Resource Management and Entrepreneurship
3. Child Development and Social Relationship
4. Art and Creative Science
5. Clothing and Textile

Admission
B.Sc: Admission test is conducted by Faculty of Biological Science of University of Dhaka. Students give separate admission test for Home Economics Unit. 550 students can get admitted each year for B.Sc. Course.

Campus
Campus is situated at 146/4 Green Road, near Pani Board., Dhaka, Bangladesh

References

University of Dhaka
Home economics education
Vocational education in Bangladesh
1996 establishments in Bangladesh
Organisations based in Dhaka